Lycée Français de Bilbao is a French international school in Zamudio, Biscay, Spain, in the Bilbao metropolitan area. It serves toute petite section through terminale (final year of lycée or senior high school/sixth form).

It opened in 1933 as the Ecoles Françaises de Bilbao/Escuelas Francesas de Bilbao.

See also
 Liceo Español Luis Buñuel, a Spanish international school near Paris, France

References

External links
  Lycée Français de Bilbao
  Lycée Français de Bilbao

Biscay
French international schools in Spain
1933 establishments in Spain
Educational institutions established in 1933
Bilbao